Tao Qian is the name of:

Tao Qian (Han dynasty) (132–194), governor of Xu province during the late Han dynasty
Tao Yuanming (365–427), Jin dynasty poet, also known as Tao Qian